Christopher M. Brochu (born June 25, 1989) is an American actor and singer-songwriter. He was born in Washington, D.C., the older brother of Doug Brochu. He is best known as Luke Parker in The Vampire Diaries and also played Ray in Lemonade Mouth and Timmy Hamilton in Soul Surfer.

Career
He was in the movies Soul Surfer, where he played "Timmy Hamilton", and in Lemonade Mouth, where he played the rude and popular lead singer of the band Mudslide Crush, "Ray Beech". He sang "And the Crowd Goes" and "Don't Ya Wish U Were Us?" along with his friend, Scott Picket (played by Nick Roux). He is also known for the role of the witch Luke Parker on the TV show The Vampire Diaries.

Filmography

Film

Television

Discography

Featured singles

Other appearances

Music videos

References

External links

American male child actors
21st-century American male actors
American male television actors
Living people
1989 births